Keith Sykes (born October 24, 1948) is an American singer-songwriter, musician and record producer. More than 100 of Sykes' songs have been recorded by John Prine, Rosanne Cash, The Judds, Jerry Jeff Walker, and George Thorogood, though he may be best known for co-writing "Volcano", the title track of Jimmy Buffett's 1979 album.

Sykes has released at least fifteen albums, including I'm Not Strange, I'm Just Like You and It Don't Hurt to Flirt, and made his television debut performing "B.I.G.T.I.M.E" as a musical guest on Saturday Night Live in 1980. Sykes owns and operates his recording studio, The Woodshed, as well as a production company and several publishing companies. The RIAA has certified recordings of his songs have sold more than 25 million copies worldwide.

Career

1960s–1970s and Jimmy Buffett 
After hitchhiking to the Newport Folk Festival in 1967, Sykes saw Arlo Guthrie perform "Alice's Restaurant Massacree" and was inspired to pursue music as a full-time career. He got his first job performing at a Holiday Inn in downtown Charleston, South Carolina after auditioning with "Alice's Restaurant Massacre". Sykes continued to perform at Holiday Inns until August 1968, when he learned of the College Coffee House Circuit in New York City. He auditioned for it, was accepted, and moved to New York. He toured colleges and coffeehouses across the U.S., playing about 75 dates a year. In New York Sykes met and befriended songwriters Jerry Jeff Walker, Emmylou Harris, John Prine, Kris Kristofferson, Gary White, and Loudon Wainwright III. Sykes signed with Vanguard Records, which would release his first two albums, his debut self-titled album in 1970, and his second album1-2-3 in 1972.

Occasionally visiting his management's office in Coconut Grove, Florida, Sykes traveled from Coconut Grove to Key West in 1972 where he met and developed a friendship and career with singer-songwriter Jimmy Buffett. Buffett would record two songs from Sykes' third album The Way That I Feel for his 1978 certified-platinum album Son of a Son of a Sailor. In January 1979, Kris Kristofferson and Rita Coolidge asked Sykes to attend an event for UNICEF in NYC. It was there that Jimmy Buffett asked Sykes to join his touring and recording band, The Coral Reefers. Sykes became the utility guitar player in The Coral Reefer Band for Buffett's 1979 tours, which included the Volcano Tour.[6]

1980s and Saturday Night Live 
After recording the Volcano album in Montserrat, Sykes recorded I'm Not Strange, I'm Just Like You, his third studio album, which was released by the independent label Memphis Records. After the album became a hit locally in 1980, Tom Petty's Backstreet Records released it and it spent 11 weeks on the Billboard charts.[7] Recorded at Ardent Studios in Memphis, I'm Not Strange includes "B.I.G.T.I.M.E.," which Sykes performed as the musical guest on Saturday Night Live and was recorded by George Thorogood.

In 1982 Backstreet Records released It Don't Hurt To Flirt, which featured the single "In Between Lies". The single did not hit and Sykes left the label. Sykes went on to record two more albums on his own independent label Memphis Records, Play X Play (1983) and Fun Rockin'  (1984).

Sykes stopped touring in 1986 in order to focus on writing, publishing and producing. During this time, Sykes signed Memphis songwriter John Kilzer to his publishing company Keith Sykes Music, and was the driving force behind Kilzer's deal with Geffen Records. Sykes is also credited with the discovery of renowned singer-songwriter Todd Snider. After receiving a cassette tape from the young, then-unknown Snider in the mail, Sykes invited him to Memphis and became solely responsible for landing Snider his first recording contract on Margaritaville Records.

1990s and Beale Street Songwriters Series 
With the release of It's About Time, 1992 saw Sykes' first solo album in close to a decade and what would become known as a "songwriter's record." The album was released on John Prine's independent record label Oh Boy Records and led to another year on the road, during which Sykes played Mountain Stage, Nashville Now and many shows with John Prine.

In the fall of 1993, Sykes made a deal with the renowned publisher Carlin International and built The Woodshed Recording Studio. He recorded all his publishing company's demos there, plus numerous indy albums and tracks.

From 1993 to 2003, Sykes hosted a popular songwriting series on Memphis' iconic Beale Street. This series showcased numerous acclaimed songwriters including folk icons Steve Earle and Guy Clark, Nashville Songwriters Hall of Fame writers Richard Leigh and Roger Cook, and then-newcomers Rivers Rutherford and Jimmy Davis.

Teaming up with Dallas businessman and investor Kelcy Warren in 1997, Sykes began to expand the abilities of his Woodshed recording studio as well as open new publishing companies. With Warren, the two formed a new label called Syren Records, which released Sykes' next two albums, rocker Advanced Medication for the Blues in 1998 and Americana-friendly Don't Count Us Out in 2001 which features duets with friends like Iris DeMent, John Prine, Rodney Crowell, and Susan Marshall.

2000s – present 
After opening a tour for Todd Snider in late 2000, Sykes was inspired to return to performing full-time, a move he has described as "the right move at the right time." Sykes continued to write and record, releasing All I Know' for MadJack Records' in 2004 and Let It Roll for Fat Pete Records in 2006. In 2008 Sykes released the album Country Morning Music, produced by Todd Snider and Peter Cooper. 2011 saw the release of Sykes' blues album, Bucksnort Blues, released on KSM Entertainment. KSME also released a "best-of" album in 2012 called 20 Most Requested featuring songs like Prine co-write "You Got Gold," heartfelt autobiographical ballad "Broken Home," and Jimmy Buffett hit "Volcano."

Known as a "troubadour of Trop Rock," Sykes latest release is a six-song EP called Songs From A Little Beach Town, inspired by Sykes' time spent in Port Aransas, TX. The album was recorded in Nashville by engineer and producer Brent Maher (The Judds, Kenny Rogers, Willie Nelson) and released in 2016. The single "Come As You Are Beach Bar" hit No. 1 on Radio A1A's TropRock Top 40 for seven weeks, and "The Best Day" charted at No. 3 and has remained on the charts since August 2016. "Coast of Marseilles" hit No. 1 on the Trop Rock Chart in February 2018.

Two of Sykes' co-writes, "Volcano" and "Coast of Marseilles," are featured in the 2018 Broadway musical "Escape to Margaritaville."The Tree of Forgiveness, John Prine's first album in 13 years, was released in 2018. The album contained "No Ordinary Blue", a song by Prine and Sykes written in the mold of "You Got Gold" and "Long Monday".

 Personal life 
Born in Murray, Kentucky, Sykes grew up in Memphis, Tennessee, where he would eventually leave a mark on the musically rich city. At 17 years old, Sykes purchased his first guitar for $20 at a pawn shop on Memphis' famed Beale Street. After years of traveling, Sykes would eventually return to Memphis and reconnect with his childhood crush, Jerene Rowe. The two married in 1976 and currently reside in Fayette County, TN outside of Memphis.

 Filmography 
Sykes made his acting debut as the lead character in the 1972 cult film Summer Soldiers, directed by Japanese avant-garde filmmaker Hiroshi Teshigahara (Woman in the Dunes). Set during the Vietnam War, the film depicts a Vietnam veteran (Sykes) who deserts from the US Army and is living on the fringe of Japanese society. Sykes spent nine weeks filming in Tokyo, Kyoto, Hiroshima, and other surrounding cities. The original Japanese title of the film is Samâ sorujâ. 

In 2017, Sykes announced he was writing a screenplay titled Horses & Me''.

Awards 
Sykes was honored with a Brass Note on the Beale Street Walk of Fame in 2016.

Discography

Studio albums

Compilation albums

Songwriting credits

Producer credits

References

External links
 
 

1948 births
Living people
American folk musicians
American folk singers
American male film actors
American male musicians
American male singer-songwriters
Record producers from Kentucky
Songwriters from Kentucky
Americana musicians
American singer-songwriters